Flaming Brothers is a 1987 Hong Kong crime action film directed by Joe Cheung. The film stars Chow Yun-fat, Alan Tang, Pat Ha and Jenny Tseng. The film was shot in Hong Kong, Macau and Thailand.

Plot
Alan Chan (Alan Tang) and Cheung Ho-tin (Chow Yun-fat) are orphans wandering in the streets of Macau who have sworn a pact to live as brothers. They make ends meet by stealing what they can. One day, while Tin was stealing food in a church, he is discovered by Ho Ka-hei (Pat Ha), who encourages him not to steal, and subsequently starts to bring food to him and his friends every day. eventually, Ka-hei gets adopted and she and Tin share a tearful farewell. Alan and Tin struggle and finally succeed in becoming triad leaders. During a gang warfare, Alan and Tin kill Chiu, the underling of a major Macau triad leader Ko Lo-sei (Patrick Tse). Ko mobilizes his men to seek revenge but the strong-willed Alan strikes back. Then, the cunning Ko pretends to reconcile with Alan and provides news for Alan to traffic arms in Thailand. However, the arms dealer turns out to be Ko's rival, Uncle Pui, and Alan nearly lost his life. With his extraordinary courage, Alan gains Pui's trust and successfully makes business. At the same time, Alan also meets Macau singer Jenny and falls in love with her and brings her back to Macau. While Alan was highlighting danger in Thailand, Tin re-encounters Ka-hei in a Catholic school and after lay each other's heart bare, they get engaged. However, Ka-hei requests Tin to leave the underworld and wants to lead a peaceful life in Hong Kong. Tin summons his courage to tell Alan about this, but Alan, while preparing big business with Tin, becomes enraged. Having to choose between his lover and his brother, Tin sadly leaves Alan. When Ko discovers that Alan safely returned from Thailand, he falls out with him and annexes all his purchased arms, formally declaring war with Alan. Later, Alan falls into Ko's trap and becomes encircled where his underlings are fully wiped out and Jenny is also killed from protecting him. Alan decides to single-highhandedly deal with Ko. In Hong Kong, Tin hears news of it and leaves his beloved wife and returns to Macau to fight with Ko alongside Alan in a gunfight where after a fierce battle, the trio dies together.

Cast

 Alan Tang as Alan Chan
 Chow Yun-fat as Cheung Ho-tin
 Pat Ha as Ho Ka Hei
 Jenny Tseng as Jenny
 Patrick Tse as Ko Lo Sei
 James Yi as Richard Lui
 Philip Chan as Police Commissioner Chan
 Norman Chui as Chiu
 Fong Yau as Uncle Pui
 Wong Kim-fung as Tai-fung
 Lau Shung-fung as Sai-fung
 Tam Yat-ching as Uncle Mosquito
 Tam Chuen-hing as Triad boss at negotiation table
 Kam Biu as Triad boss at negotiation table
 Yue Man-wa as Triad boss at negotiation table
 Ko Hung as Brother Hung
 Pa San as Ko's bodyguard
 Steve Mak as Ko's bodyguard
 Hung San-nam as Ko's bodyguard
 Tang Tai-wo as Ko's bodyguard
 Kan Tat-wah as Inspector Law
 Soh Hang-suen as Sister Lucia
 Felix Lok as Man at convenience store
 Joe Cheung as Alan's man outside Chiu's pub
 Chun Wong as Street vendor
 Cheung Chok-chow as Bread street vendor
 Jeffrey Ho as Mr. Wong
 Sai Gwa-Pau as Resident of old folks home
 Cheung Hei as Resident of old folks home
 Chin Tsi-ang as Resident of old folks home
 Sze-to On as Resident of old folks home
 Chan Lap-ban as Resident of old folks home
 Stanley Tong as Hitman in Thailand
 Sam Wong as Hitman in Thailand
 Alex Ng as Chiu's man
 Wo Seung as Chiu's man
 Wong Chi-ming as Chiu's man
 Sing Yan as Brother Hung's man
 Yiu Man-kei as Ko's man
 Choi Kwok-keung as Ko's man
 Poon Kin-kwan as Ko's man
 Tang Chiu-yan as Ko's man
 Chan Ming-wai as Alan's man
 Chun Kwai-bo as Alan's man
 To Wai-wo as Ko's horse trainer
 Ho Chi-moon as Club customer
 Wong Ka-leung
 Wong Chi-keung

Theme song
I Am Just a Person (我祇是個人)
Composer: Violet Lam
Lyricist: Calvin Poon
Singer: Su Rui

Box office
The film grossed HK$15,741,778 at the Hong Kong box office during its theatrical run 30 July to 18 August 1987 in Hong Kong.

See also
 Chow Yun-fat filmography
 List of Hong Kong films

External links

Flaming Brothers at Hong Kong Cinemagic

1987 films
1987 action thriller films
1980s crime action films
1980s crime thriller films
1980s romantic action films
1980s Cantonese-language films
Films set in Hong Kong
Films set in Macau
Films set in Thailand
Films shot in Thailand
Gun fu films
Hong Kong films about revenge
Hong Kong action thriller films
Hong Kong crime action films
Hong Kong crime thriller films
Hong Kong romantic action films
Triad films
1980s Hong Kong films